This is a list of Bollywood Movie Award for Best Film winners.

External links
 Official website

See also
 Bollywood Movie Awards
 Bollywood
 Cinema of India

Film
Awards for best film